Zahruiyeh (also Romanized as Zahrū’īyeh) is a village in Raviz Rural District, Koshkuiyeh District, Rafsanjan County, Kerman Province, Iran. At the 2006 census, its population was 17, in 4 families.

References 

Populated places in Rafsanjan County